Palter is a surname. Notable people with the surname include:

Jesse Palter, American singer-songwriter
Morris Palter, Canadian musician
Scott Palter (died 2020), American game designer

See also
Balter
Halter (surname)
Paltering, a form of lying by using selective truths to mislead